Patonga is a suburb of the Central Coast region of New South Wales, Australia, located on the north bank of the Hawkesbury River, southwest of Woy Woy. It is part of the  local government area.

Geography
Patonga is a small and semi-isolated riverside community occupying a one kilometre long sandy spit projecting from the rocky and elevated headland of the Brisbane Water National Park to the north. The spit, at the mouth of the estuarine Patonga Creek which feeds into the Hawkesbury River at Broken Bay, forms a beach frontage onto Brisk Bay to the east and a sandy foreshore on the creek to the west.

Patonga can be accessed by road along Patonga Drive from Umina to the north, by ferry from Palm Beach and Brooklyn, or by private watercraft. The community extends to housing, accessible only by watercraft, which occupies Patonga Creek's foreshore on the opposite bank. Various bush tracks provide hiking access to Patonga and the surrounding reserves.

Patonga Creek was once navigable by fairly large vessels, but now averages about half a metre in depth. Gosford City Council have acknowledged the siltation problem. Lion Island is located in Broken Bay to the suburb's southeast.

The nearby towns of Umina Beach, Ettalong Beach and Woy Woy are significant neighbouring communities which provide many facilities and services not available at Patonga.

Origin of name
Patonga means "oyster" in the Guringai people's language, whose country stretches from the north side of Port Jackson to the southern end of Lake Macquarie. Early English language maps of the area spelt Patonga as "Betonga".

Local industry and facilities
Oyster farming is the main local industry along with eco-tourism and recreational tourism.

Along with visitors from the Central coast, day trippers from Sydney, Newcastle, and other areas of the NSW provide customers to the handful of retail outlets. These include a takeaway, a convenience store, a cafe, a tavern with a restaurant and some accommodation as well as a handful of art galleries.

Recreational facilities and infrastructure include a sports oval, a public boat ramp to the eastern end of the village, a public wharf and a two-hectare camping and caravan park located at the southern end of the village (accessed by Patonga and Bay Streets). The wharf is also used by commercially operated ferries providing services on the Hawkesbury River and Broken Bay.

The Patonga Camping Ground is operated by Gosford City Council. Families especially take advantage of the tranquil setting afforded by the sandy creek foreshore, beach, and the opportunity for canoeing, boating, fishing and hiking. The camping ground includes two tennis courts, modern amenities, sheltered BBQ facilities, and one of the two play grounds for children in Patonga.

Patonga and the film industry
Patonga provided the setting for the fishing village of Graves Point in the 1996 television movie loosely based on Peter Benchley's novel, 'The Beast', a sci-fi horror-drama in which a rare giant squid threatens a small seaport community. The featured sea-side cottage near the wharf was constructed as a film set and demolished on completion. Patonga has also featured in many other movies and TV shows such as Oyster Farmer, Micro Nation, Home and Away and many other big known titles.

References

Suburbs of the Central Coast (New South Wales)